The Superior University, is a private university in Lahore, Punjab, Pakistan.

Charter and recognition 
Superior University is chartered by the Government of Punjab, Pakistan and recognized by the Higher Education Commission (Pakistan) (HEC).

Board of Management 
The Superior Group has the following Board of Management:

 Prof. Dr. Ch Abdul Rehman (chairman)
 Prof. Dr. Ch Abdul Khaliq (managing director)
 Ibn E Abbas Ashraf, FCCA (UK) (Group Chief Internal Auditor)
 Muhammad Riaz (executive director)
 Pirzada Sami Ullah Sabri (Director General)
 Mirza Moazm Baig (Director Finance)
 Bilal Hanif (Director Schools)
 Ayesha Zahid (Executive Director DPRC)
 Afshan Hameed (Director HR)
 Muhammad Sohaib Mehmood (Director Marketing)
 Asad Ullah Sheikh (Director Global Engagement)
 Haseeb Khan (Director Communications)
 Mudasar Kamran (Registrar)

Journal
Superior is publishing a journal to promote research activities. International Journal of Management Research & Emerging Sciences is a high quality international refereed research journal with an  E which is published once in a year. Journal is published by Azra Naheed Center Research & Development (ANCRD). They follow "double blind peer review policy" of reviewing research work submitted to International Journal of Management Research & Emerging Sciences. The open access policy of the journal aims at increasing the visibility and accessibility of the published content.

Consultancy and International Conferences
Superior is engaged in consultancy services through A.N. Consultants platform. Superior has also organized several International Conferences for promoting the research culture in Pakistan.

International Partners 
Superior has several international partner Universities and educational institutions. Some of these partners are following:
 University of Cumbria (UK) 
 Concordia University Wisconsin (USA) 
 The University of Newcastle (Australia) 
 Uppsala University (Sweden) 
 IESEG School of Management (France) 
 Binary University (Malaysia)

Center for Human Resource Development 
CHRD programs include seminars, conferences and training workshops for the service of employees and students.

Programs 

Undergraduate programs
B.Sc Hons. Biotechnology
B.Sc Hons. Biotechnology and Microbiology
B.Sc Hons. Biotechnology and Biochemistry
B.Sc Hons. Biotechnology and Molecular Biology
BS Avionics Engineering
BS Mass Communication
BS Interior Design Management
BS Product Design Management
BBA (Hons.)
BS Aviation Management
BS Aviation Engineering Technology
BS Computer Science
BS Software Engineering 
B.Sc Computer Engineering
BS Telecommunications
B.Sc Electrical Engineering
BS Electrical Systems
B.Arch Bachelor of Architecture
BS Electrical Engineering Technology
BS Electronics Engineering Technology
BS Mechanical Engineering Technology
BS Civil Engineering Technology
BS HVAC Engineering Technology
BS Industrial Management
B.Com. (Hons.)
Bachelor of Economics and Law
Association of Chartered Certified Accountants (ACCA) (UK)
Certified Accounting Technician (CAT) (UK)
BS (Hons.) Accounting and Finance
Certified Management Accountant (CMA)
Azra Naheed Medical College
MBBS (Degree is awarded by University of Health Sciences Lahore)
Doctor of Physiotherapy (DPT)
Doctor of Pharmacy (Pharm.D)

Post graduate programs
MBA (Professional)
MBA (Executive)
MBA (2 years)
MBA Entrepreneurship Development
MBA Pharmaceutical Management
Masters in Educational Leadership
Masters in Public Administration
Masters in Mass Communication
M.Sc Human Resource Management (HRM)
MIT Master of Information Technology
M.Sc Quality Management
M.Sc Industrial Management
M.Sc Economics
Master's degree in Business Economics
M.Com
LL.B (Degree is awarded by University of the Punjab)

Research programs
Ph.D Business Management
Ph.D in Law
Ph.D Computer Science
MS Business Administration
MS/MPhil Economics
MS/MPhil Commerce
MS Human Resource Management (HRM)
LL.M
MS Computer Sciences
MS Quality Management
MS Industrial Management

Facilities 
Hostels
Bookshop
Cafeteria
Science Lab
Information technology (IT) Lab
Transport
Library
Play Ground
Architecture Studio

See also 
Azra Naheed Medical College

References

External links 
 Official website
 Official website of Superior Gold Campus
 Official website of Azra Naheed Medical College – ANMC

Pakistan education-related lists
Educational institutions established in 2000
2000 establishments in Pakistan
Film schools in Pakistan
Universities and colleges in Lahore
Engineering universities and colleges in Pakistan
Private universities and colleges in Punjab, Pakistan